Estádio Olímpico São Benedito or Diogão, as it is usually called, is a stadium located in Bragança, Brazil. It is used mostly for football matches and hosts the home matches of Bragantino and Caeté. The stadium has a maximum capacity of 11,000 people.

References

External links
Diogão on OGol
Diogão on Federação Paraense de Futebol

Football venues in Pará